William Sands Silsby Sr. (May 15, 1902 – September 19, 1987) was an American politician and lawyer from Maine. A Republican from Aurora, Maine, Bates served in the Maine House of Representatives and was its Speaker from 1951 to 1952. His father (Herbert Trafton Silsby), grandfather (Charles Silsby) and great grandfather (Samuel Silsby) all also served in the House, representing Aurora.

References

Members of the Maine House of Representatives
1902 births
1987 deaths
20th-century American politicians